Bayerotrochus midas, common name King Midas's slit shell, is a species of sea snail, a marine gastropod mollusk in the family Pleurotomariidae.

Description
The size of the shell varies between 60 mm and 128 mm. Dead Bayerotrochus midas can form shallow marine sediments, and can grow at least as long as 78.9mm.

Distribution
This species occurs in the Caribbean Sea and the Gulf of Mexico; in the Atlantic Ocean off the Bahamas.

References

 Williams S.T., Karube S. & Ozawa T. (2008) Molecular systematics of Vetigastropoda: Trochidae, Turbinidae and Trochoidea redefined. Zoologica Scripta 37: 483–506
 Rosenberg, G., F. Moretzsohn, and E. F. García. 2009. Gastropoda (Mollusca) of the Gulf of Mexico, pp. 579–699 in Felder, D.L. and D.K. Camp (eds.), Gulf of Mexico–Origins, Waters, and Biota. Biodiversity. Texas A&M Press, College Station, Texas.

External links
 

Pleurotomariidae
Gastropods described in 1966